Super Bowl XLIV was an American football game between the National Football Conference (NFC) champions New Orleans Saints and the American Football Conference (AFC) champions Indianapolis Colts to decide the National Football League (NFL) champion for the 2009 season. The underdog Saints defeated the Colts by a score of 31–17, earning the franchise its first Super Bowl win. The game was played at Sun Life Stadium (now Hard Rock Stadium) in Miami Gardens, Florida, for the fifth time (and in South Florida for the tenth time), on February 7, 2010, which was the latest calendar date for a Super Bowl until Super Bowl LVI in 2022.

This was the Saints' first Super Bowl appearance and the fourth for the Colts franchise, their second appearance in four seasons. The Saints entered the game with a 13–3 record for the 2009 regular season, compared to the Colts' 14–2 record. In the playoff games, both teams placed first in their respective conferences, marking the first time since Super Bowl XXVIII (16 years previously) that both number-one seeds have reached the Super Bowl. The Colts entered the Super Bowl off victories over the Baltimore Ravens and New York Jets, while the Saints advanced after defeating the previous year's runners up, the Arizona Cardinals, and then overcoming the Minnesota Vikings in the Conference Championship. It was also the first time both teams started with a 13-game winning streak.

New Orleans was behind 10–6 at halftime of Super Bowl XLIV. During a play many consider the turning point of the game, Thomas Morstead kicked off the second half with a surprise onside kick. The Saints recovered the kick and soon got their first lead of the game with Pierre Thomas's 16-yard touchdown reception. The Colts responded with Joseph Addai's 4-yard touchdown run to regain the lead at 17–13. The Saints then scored 18 unanswered points, including Tracy Porter's 74-yard interception return for a touchdown, to clinch the victory. New Orleans quarterback Drew Brees, who completed 32 of 39 passes for 288 yards and two touchdowns, was named the Super Bowl MVP. His 32 completions tied a Super Bowl record set by Tom Brady in Super Bowl XXXVIII.

The live broadcast of the game on CBS was watched by an average U.S. audience of 106.5 million viewers, making it then the most-watched Super Bowl. The National Anthem was sung by Carrie Underwood, and the halftime show featured the British rock band The Who. Super Bowl XLIV was the last Super Bowl to have a uniquely designed logo as its predecessors had: starting with Super Bowl XLV, the logo was permanently settled to bear the Vince Lombardi Trophy and the Roman numerals denoting the edition of the game. This is also the earliest Super Bowl in which neither team has since re-appeared.

Background

Host selection process

The league initially voted on March 23, 2005, that New York City host the game, contingent on the completion of the proposed West Side Stadium being built for the New York Jets by 2008. After New York state government officials declined to approve $400 million for the stadium, the NFL decided to reopen the bidding for the game's site. The league reconsidered the other, unsuccessful candidates for Super Bowl XLIII: Atlanta, Houston, and Miami. On October 6, 2006, the league selected Miami as the host city, with the formerly-named-Joe Robbie Stadium as the venue.

This was the tenth time the Super Bowl has been held in the Miami Metro area at the home stadium of the Miami Dolphins: the formerly-named Joe Robbie Stadium had hosted four previous Super Bowls (XXIII, XXIX, XXXIII, and XLI) and five were played in the Dolphins' now demolished former home, the Miami Orange Bowl (II, III, V, X, XIII). The Colts franchise was playing its fourth Super Bowl, all of which were played in Miami (two at the Orange Bowl and two at then-named Sun Life Stadium). They are the only franchise to play all of its Super Bowls in the same city and the second to play two or more Super Bowls in two different stadiums (joining the Broncos who played two at Qualcomm Stadium in San Diego and two at the Louisiana Superdome in New Orleans, and the Patriots who played Super Bowls in three stadiums twice – Reliant/NRG Stadium in Houston, University of Phoenix/State Farm Stadium in Glendale, and the Louisiana Superdome).

With Tampa as the host of Super Bowl XLIII, Super Bowl XLIV also marked the third time that consecutive Super Bowls have been played in the same state. Super Bowls II and III were both played at the Orange Bowl. Super Bowls XXI and XXII were both played in California: XXI at Pasadena's Rose Bowl Stadium and XXII at San Diego's Jack Murphy Stadium.

Miami became the first city to host two Super Bowls designated as a National Special Security Event (NSSE). In the wake of the September 11, 2001, terrorist attacks, every Super Bowl since Super Bowl XXXVI has been designated as an NSSE. Super Bowl XLI was Miami's first Super Bowl designated as an NSSE.

Pro Bowl changes

The 2010 Pro Bowl was played on January 31, during the off-week between the conference championships and the Super Bowl, breaking with the precedent of scheduling the game for the Sunday after the Super Bowl. The game also changed venues from Aloha Stadium in Honolulu, Hawaii, where it had been held since 1979, to Sun Life Stadium in Miami (the same city and stadium hosting the Super Bowl itself). Fourteen players from the Super Bowl participants, seven from each team, had been selected but were unable to participate due to the change. The new schedule took advantage of the bye week given to the conference champions to rest and prepare for the Super Bowl. The Pro Bowl returned to Honolulu the following season and remained there until 2015, when it was played in Glendale, Arizona, a week before Super Bowl XLIX, also in Glendale. The game returned to Honolulu in 2016, and beginning in 2017 was played in Orlando permanently. This, however, changed again in 2020, when the league announced that the 2021 Pro Bowl would be played at the new Allegiant Stadium in Las Vegas.

The move also meant that the Pro Bowl, which was won by the AFC by a score of 41–34, would avoid competing against the 2010 NBA All-Star Game, the second full day of competition in the 2010 Winter Olympics, and the 52nd running of the Daytona 500, as would have been the case had the game been played on February 14 per its traditional post-Super Bowl scheduling.

Teams

New Orleans Saints

The New Orleans Saints finished the season with an NFC best 13–3 record and went on to advance to the first Super Bowl in their 43 years as an NFL team. After joining the NFL in 1967, it took them 21 years to record their first winning season and another 13 years after that to win their first playoff game. Five years later, the New Orleans area suffered another setback when the Louisiana Superdome was devastated with the rest of the city by Hurricane Katrina, forcing them to play all of their home games in  elsewhere as they finished with a 3–13 record (see Effect of Hurricane Katrina on the New Orleans Saints). But in the off-season, the team's fortunes began to turn. First, they signed free agent quarterback Drew Brees, who would go on to throw for more passing yards than any other quarterback over the next four seasons. They also drafted multi-talented Heisman Trophy winning (since vacated) running back Reggie Bush, receiver Marques Colston, and guard Jahri Evans, three players who would become major contributors on the Saints' offense. The following season, New Orleans improved to 10–6 and advanced to the NFC title game for the first time, which they lost to the Chicago Bears. Although they failed to make the playoffs over the next two seasons, they continued to sign new talent, and by 2009 they were ready to make another run at the Super Bowl.

The Saints' offense led the NFL in scoring, averaging just under 32 points per game. Brees finished the season as the NFL's top rated quarterback (109.6), completing an NFL-record 70.6% of his passes for 4,338 yards and 34 touchdowns, with just 11 interceptions. His top target was Colston, who caught 70 passes for 1,074 yards and 9 touchdowns, but he had plenty of other weapons, such as receivers Devery Henderson (51 receptions) and Robert Meachem (45), along with tight ends Jeremy Shockey (48) and Dave Thomas (35). With fullback Heath Evans out of action due to injury for most of the season, Dave Thomas often lined up as a fullback, with tackle Zach Strief serving as an extra blocker on short yardage plays. The ground attack was led by running backs Pierre Thomas and Mike Bell. Thomas rushed for 793 yards and caught 39 passes for 302, while Bell added 654 yards on the ground. Bush was also a major contributor, rushing for 390 yards (with a 5.6 yards per carry average), catching 47 passes for 335 yards, and adding another 130 yards returning punts. New Orleans also had a strong offensive line with three Pro Bowl selections: guard Jahri Evans, center Jonathan Goodwin, and tackle Jon Stinchcomb.

Defensive lineman Will Smith led the team in sacks with 13. Another big weapon on defense was linebacker Jonathan Vilma, who led the team with 87 tackles and intercepted three passes. The Saints' secondary was led by 12-year veteran safety Darren Sharper, who recorded 9 interceptions and set an NFL record by returning them for 376 yards and three touchdowns. Cornerback Tracy Porter was also effective, recording 49 tackles and 4 picks with one touchdown.

The Saints started out the season strong, winning their first 13 games. But then they became the first 13–0 team ever to lose their last three games of the year. After losing their 14th game to the Dallas Cowboys 24–17, they suffered a narrow loss to the Tampa Bay Buccaneers (20–17 in overtime) after Garrett Hartley missed a potential game-winning field goal. With the team's playoff seed clinched, head coach Sean Payton chose to rest Brees and other starters in the final game of the season, resulting in a 23–10 loss to the Carolina Panthers. The string of defeats cast a cloud over the team's postseason chances. Still, they clinched the No. 1 NFC playoff seed and scored 76 points in their two playoff wins en route to their first ever Super Bowl.

Indianapolis Colts

Indianapolis had the NFL-best 14–2 record, winning seven games by less than a touchdown, on their way to earning their second Super Bowl appearance in the last four years. Once again, the Colts boasted a powerful offense led by 10-time Pro Bowl quarterback Peyton Manning, who threw for over 4,500 yards and 33 touchdowns during the season, with only 16 interceptions, earning him a 99.9 passer rating and a league record fourth National Football League Most Valuable Player Award.  Under the protection of Pro Bowl center Jeff Saturday and the rest of the line, Manning had been sacked just 13 times during the regular season, the fewest in the NFL.  His top targets were veteran receiver Reggie Wayne and tight end Dallas Clark, who both recorded 100 receptions and 10 touchdowns. Wayne led the team with 1,260 yards, while Clark was second with 1,106. Manning also had other reliable targets, such as recently drafted receivers Austin Collie (60 receptions for 676 yards and 7 touchdowns) and Pierre Garçon (47 receptions for 765 yards and 4 touchdowns). Running back Joseph Addai led the Colts' ground game with 821 rushing yards and 10 touchdowns, while also catching 51 passes for another 336 yards and 3 scores.

Indianapolis' defensive line was led by Pro Bowl defensive ends Robert Mathis and Dwight Freeney.  Freeney led the team with 13.5 sacks, while Mathis added 9.5 sacks and forced 5 fumbles.  Behind them, the Colts had a solid corps of linebackers featuring Clint Session and Gary Brackett, who each recorded 80 tackles. Pro Bowl safety Antoine Bethea led the secondary with 70 tackles and four interceptions.

Under their new coach Jim Caldwell, the Colts started off the season with 14 consecutive wins before suffering their first loss to the New York Jets, 29–15, a game in which Caldwell made the controversial decision to rest his starters after the team took a slim lead rather than keep them in to play for a chance at a 16–0 season. Indianapolis finished the season at 14–2 following a loss to the Buffalo Bills, in which they rested their starters and went on to advance to the Super Bowl, making them perfect in all their games in which their starters played all four-quarters.

Caldwell led the Colts to the Super Bowl the season after Tony Dungy retired, just like in Tampa Bay when Jon Gruden led the Tampa Bay Buccaneers to Super Bowl XXXVII after Dungy was fired. Senior offensive line coach Howard Mudd retired following the game.

Playoffs

The Saints started off their playoff run with a dominating 45–14 win over the defending NFC champion Arizona Cardinals. The Cardinals were coming off a 51–45 overtime win over the Green Bay Packers in which they racked up 531 yards against a defense ranked second in the league in total yards allowed. However, although the Cardinals scored on their first play of the game, the Saints dominated the Cardinals with 35 points in the first half. First, Lynell Hamilton scored on a 1-yard run. Then, Sharper recovered a fumble from the Cardinals, setting up Brees' touchdown pass to Shockey. Following a punt, Bush scored on a franchise playoff record 46-yard run. In the second quarter, Brees added two more touchdown passes, one to Henderson on a flea flicker and the other to Colston that was set up by a Will Smith interception, giving them a 35–14 first half lead before adding 10 more points in the second half on a Hartley field goal and Bush's 83-yard punt return. Bush racked up 217 all-purpose yards, while Brees threw for 247 yards and three touchdowns.

Their opponent in the NFC Championship Game was the Minnesota Vikings, led by 11-time Pro Bowl quarterback Brett Favre, who had thrown four touchdown passes in their divisional round win over the Dallas Cowboys. Even though the Saints' offense could only muster 257 total yards, their defense made up for it by forcing five turnovers. Additionally, the Saints outgained the Vikings in punt and kickoff return yards 166 to 50. The key play of the game occurred late in the fourth quarter with the score tied 28–28 and the Vikings driving for a potential game-winning field goal. With less than a minute left, they reached the Saints 33-yard line. But after two runs for no gain and a penalty that pushed them back to the 38, Porter picked off a pass from Favre to send the game into overtime. After the Saints won the coin toss, Pierre Thomas's 40-yard kickoff return set up a 10-play, 39-yard drive that ended with a game winning 40-yard field goal by Hartley, sending the Saints to their first ever Super Bowl.

The Colts' first opponent was the Baltimore Ravens, a 9–7 squad that had advanced to the divisional round by defeating the New England Patriots 33–14, forcing four turnovers from their All-Pro quarterback Tom Brady. Against the Colts, however, all they could manage was a field goal on their opening drive. Indianapolis built up a 17–3 first half lead with a Matt Stover field goal and Manning's touchdown passes to Wayne and Collie. In the second half, the Colts survived two interceptions from Ravens safety Ed Reed on one drive, one of which Reed fumbled, and the other which was called back by a penalty. Stover, who spent 18 years with the Modell franchise, finished the drive with his second field goal to make final score 20–3, as their defense put the game away by forcing two consecutive turnovers.

Their next opponent was in the AFC Championship Game against the New York Jets, who had made the playoffs in part due to Caldwell's decision to bench his starters in their Week 16 meeting.  This time, the Colts would have to mount a comeback, as the Jets built up a 17–6 first half lead. Yet the Colts would step up to the challenge, scoring 24 unanswered points. First, Manning completed three passes to Collie for 80 yards, the last one a 16-yard touchdown completion to cut the score to 17–13 at the end of the half.  Manning added two more touchdown passes in the second half, one to Garçon and one to Clark, and Stover added a 21-yard field goal to close out the scoring. Manning finished the game with 377 passing yards and three touchdowns, while Garçon and Collie had over 100 receiving yards each.

This was the first Super Bowl matchup in which both teams had a first-round bye since Super Bowl XXXIX. All four of the Super Bowls in-between had one team that played all three rounds (two of which were wild card teams), with three of those teams (including the Colts in Super Bowl XLI) winning it all.

Broadcasting

Television

United States
The game was televised live in the United States on CBS, capping the network's 50th season of NFL coverage (1956–93; 1998–present). This was the 17th Super Bowl telecast for CBS, the largest total among the "big four" US television networks. CBS had also broadcast the previous Super Bowl held in South Florida (XLI). Play-by-play announcer Jim Nantz and color commentator Phil Simms were in the broadcast booth, with Steve Tasker and Solomon Wilcots serving as sideline reporters. The game was preceded by The Super Bowl Today, a four-hour pregame show hosted by James Brown and featuring analysts Dan Marino, Boomer Esiason, Shannon Sharpe and Bill Cowher along with several other commentators, which started at 2pm EST. A kickoff show for the game aired from 6pm EST to 6:28pm EST. A Spanish language broadcast was aired on the second audio program, with play-by-play announcer Armando Quintero and color analyst Benny Ricardo.

With an average U.S. audience of 106.5 million viewers, this was the third most-watched Super Bowl, trailing only the 111 million viewers for Super Bowl XLV the following year and 111.3 million viewers for Super Bowl XLVI. At the time, it was the most-watched program of any kind in American television history, beating the 27-year-long record previously held by the final episode of M*A*S*H, "Goodbye, Farewell and Amen", which coincidentally, also aired on CBS, and was watched by 105.97 million viewers. An estimated 153.4 million total viewers watched all or part of the game. The game drew a national Nielsen rating of 45.0 with a 68 share, the highest for a Super Bowl since Super Bowl XXX in 1996 (46.0/68). The telecast drew a 56.3 rating in New Orleans and a 54.2 rating in Indianapolis, first and fourth respectively among local markets.

Commercials

Notable returnees and absences
Perennial Super Bowl advertisers Anheuser–Busch InBev and CareerBuilder stated their commitment to advertise in Super Bowl XLIV, showing eight and two different spots during the game, respectively. A 30-second spot cost US $2.8 million with several advertisers getting discounts, down from the previous year's $3 million. All advertising slots were sold out on February 1, 2010, six days before the game. Pepsi-Cola had previously stated their commitment to advertise, but then said they would not be buying any commercial time, marking the first time in 23 years that Pepsi did not run an ad during the Super Bowl itself.  FedEx also stated that they would not buy ad time. Both Pepsi and FedEx are official NFL sponsors. Coca-Cola and Dr Pepper Snapple Group capitalized on Pepsi's absence by buying ads in the game; Dr Pepper's ad featured KISS performing "Calling Dr. Love", while one of Coca-Cola's three ads featured Montgomery Burns (of Fox's The Simpsons) losing everything he owns. Also for the second straight year, one of the Big Three American automobile makers – General Motors – did not have a commercial in the game. Ford had one commercial for the Ford Edge featuring Mike Rowe. Chrysler's Dodge brand did advertise this year for its Dodge Charger, narrated by Michael C. Hall.

What aired
Frito-Lay's Doritos brand, in turn owned by PepsiCo, had four consumer-created advertisements scheduled. The first three ads – running in the first quarter – featured a sly dog using an anti-bark collar to his advantage to steal a man's Doritos, a fast-handed boy defending his Doritos and his mother from a potential suitor, and a man faking his death for free Doritos. The fourth ad, featuring an angry gym rat who was overprotective for his Doritos being stolen, aired in the fourth quarter. Had three of the ads topped the USA Today Super Bowl Ad Meter rankings, the commercial's creators would have won a total of US$5 million ($1 million for first, $600,000 for second and $400,000 for third, plus a $1 million bonus for each of the three finalists). The previous year, Joe and David Herbert's "Free Doritos" ad topped the survey and won $1 million. The United States Census Bureau spent $2.5million on a 30-second spot, directed by noted independent filmmaker Christopher Guest, for the 2010 United States Census, which urged Americans to answer its questionnaires that will be sent out in the next few weeks. McDonald's aired a commercial, updating a famous ad from the early 1990s, in which NBA superstars LeBron James and Dwight Howard (replacing Michael Jordan and Larry Bird) play an otherworldly game of H-O-R-S-E, with a McDonald's lunch going to the winner – however, they soon look over and see that Bird has helped himself to it. Mars Chocolate returned three years after its controversial Snickers ad that was protested by gay groups with two men kissing one another that was pulled one day following the game (see Super Bowl XLI: Commercials).  The commercial – winner of the annual Ad Meter survey – featured veteran actors Betty White and Abe Vigoda playing full-contact backyard football.

The rest of the Top Five:
2. The aforementioned Doritos's amateur ad featuring a dog strapped to an anti-bark collar getting revenge on a teasing man.
3. A Bud Light ad with a house completely made of beer cans of the sponsor's product.
4. A Budweiser ad featuring the relationship between a Clydesdale and a Longhorn steer.
5. Coca-Cola's man walking through an African savanna in the middle of the night.

The YouTube Top Five of their "2010 Ad Blitz" were:

 Another Doritos ad that showed a kid slapping his mom's suitor.
 E-Trade's baby with his girlfriend.
 The Doritos dog collar ad.
 The Snickers Betty White/Abe Vigoda ad.
 The Doritos commercial with the gym rat.

ADBOWL results reflected the following ranking:
 Snickers: You're Not You – Betty White & Abe Vigoda
 Doritos: House Rules
 Volkswagen: "Punch Dub" Game
 Google: Parisian Love
 Doritos: Underdog

Internet domain registrar GoDaddy, which created a racy ad the year after the Super Bowl XXXVIII halftime show controversy, bought two ads in the Super Bowl for the sixth consecutive year. Advertising Age reported that Paramount Pictures bought a Super Bowl spot for the upcoming films Iron Man 2 and The Last Airbender. A trailer for the HBO miniseries The Pacific was also aired.

Other advertisers for 2010 included Homeaway Inc., paying tribute to National Lampoon's Vacation with their stars Chevy Chase and Beverly D'Angelo, and Diamond Foods, who returned to promote both its Emerald Nuts brand and Pop Secret popcorn, which they bought from General Mills two years before. Boost Mobile aired a special ad, celebrating the 25th Anniversary of The Super Bowl Shuffle, featuring many of the 1985 Chicago Bears to advertise their US$50 per month service. Also, in a CBS-produced promo for the Late Show with David Letterman, the eponymous host and his longtime talk show rival, Jay Leno, appeared together with Oprah Winfrey.

Controversies
Three advertisers in particular raised eyebrows with their choice to advertise during the Super Bowl. One new advertiser, Focus on the Family, aired a commercial featuring 2007 Heisman Trophy winner Tim Tebow and his mother that elicited criticism from some women's groups who demanded CBS cancel the ad because they claimed it would be divisive, under the impression that it would mention Tebow's mother was advised, for health issues, to abort her son Tim, but she chose to give birth to him. In the first quarter, CBS aired the advertisement, which had not been pre-released to the public. Per a statement released earlier, the ad did not mention the topic of abortion explicitly.

One proposed sponsor, ManCrunch, a gay dating site that bills itself as a place "where many many many men come out to play", had expressed interest in purchasing a 30-second advertisement. The ManCrunch advertisement would have depicted a male Green Bay Packers fan and a male Minnesota Vikings fan reaching into the same bowl of potato chips at the same time and, after a brief pause, begin to passionately kiss. ManCrunch's ad, which has since been released to the public, was initially put on a waiting list before the network outright rejected it due to it violating CBS's broadcast standards. ManCrunch immediately accused CBS of discrimination. Some observers suspect that their advertisement was an attempt at ambush marketing and free publicity. Another ad that was rejected by CBS for failure to meet standards was for the texting service kgb, which focuses on two men with CGI-enhanced images bent over with their heads in their posteriors, while an actor, Sean Gunn, portraying an agent stated that "They had their head up their [backsides]". kgb instead aired an ad with two people who had to find the Japanese word for "I surrender" before being run over by a sumo wrestler. Another ad for Bud Light which was rejected showed workers stripping down for a charity clothes drive in exchange for free beer. All of the rejected ads were shown on YouTube.

Among other rejected or modified ads were one for Electronic Arts' Dante's Inferno, which had to be edited for content (the closing phrase, originally intended to read "go to Hell", was replaced with "Hell awaits"), and GoDaddy's originally planned advertisement. Career Builder's ad, showing people dressed too casually for "Casual Friday" and a Dockers ad to promote a free pair of their pants with men in shirts but sans trousers aired back-to-back early in the second quarter.

An E*TRADE advertisement, continuing their theme of talking babies on a Web cam, featured a boyfriend-stealing, "milkaholic" baby girl named "Lindsay." Actress Lindsay Lohan, who has a history of alcoholism and was noted for having tried in the early 2000s to date popular young men who were already dating other women, attempted to sue E*TRADE over the advertisement, seeking US$100 million in damages, under the impression that the advertisement defamed her via subliminal messaging and violated her personality rights. E*TRADE denied the allegations and stated the name "Lindsay" came from a member of the accounting staff. Lohan and E*TRADE settled the lawsuit in September 2010; the terms were confidential.

International telecasts
Viewers worldwide were able to watch on the following channels:
North America:
: CTV (English) and RDS (French) (subject to simsub due to CRTC mandates all cable/satellite providers to replace the American feed.)
: Televisa, TV Azteca (broadcasting in HD).
: Tropical Vision Limited, Great Belize Television.
: ESPN, Fox Sports Latin America.
: ESPN, Fox Sports Latin America.
: ESPN, Fox Sports Latin America.

Oceania
: Fox Sports 3, ESPN, Channel Ten and One HD
: Sky Sport 2 and ESPN
Europe:
: Puls 4 started at 23:30 (CET)
: Prime Sport
: TV3+/TV3+ HD starting at 22:00 (CET)
: ESPN America.
: Nelonen Sport Pro and on Viasat Sport/Viasat Sport HD started at 00:00 (CET)
: W9
: ARD Das Erste started at 23:35 (CET)
 : Nova Sports started 01:30 (EET)
: Sport 1
 and : BBC One and on Sky Sports 1 and HD 1 at 10:55 pm and 11 pm (GMT)
: Rai Sport Più started at 22:00 (CET), Rai Due started at 00:15 (CET), broadcast also in HD in selected areas.
: NRK1 started at 23:15 (CET) and on Viasat Sport/Viasat Sport HD
: Polsat Sport/Polsat Sport HD started at 00:00 (CET)
: SportTV 2 and on SportTV HD started at 23:00 (WET)
: Sport 1 started 01:00 (EET)
: NTV Plus
: Šport TV 1
: Canal+
: TV6 No longer available on TV6. Super Bowl is broadcast on TV10 and on Viasat Sport/Viasat Sport HD started at 00:00 (CET).
: Turkey′′′: Fox Sports [Turkey] Spormax HD started 01.00 (EET)

South America:
: ESPN
: ESPN and Esporte Interativo
 and : ESPN, Fox Sports Latin America
: ESPN
: ESPN

Asia:
: CCTV-5, G-Sports, Guangdong Sports, Sina TV
: ATV
: NHK, NTV

Radio
On radio, Westwood One had the national English-language broadcast rights to the game in the United States and Canada. Marv Albert (play-by-play) and Boomer Esiason (color commentator) called the game for the network; it was the last broadcast Albert would do for Westwood One, due to his desire to focus on his basketball coverage duties. The teams' flagship stations also carried the game with their respective local announcers: WLHK-FM and WFNI-AM in Indianapolis (with Bob Lamey and Will Wolford announcing) and WWL-FM/AM in New Orleans (with Jim Henderson and Hokie Gajan announcing). The Saints' radio broadcast on WWL-AM was available throughout much of the United States, since WWL is a Class A clear channel station. Univision Radio aired a Spanish-language feed for Hispanophone American listeners (with Clemson Smith-Muñiz and David Crommett announcing).

Sirius XM Satellite Radio carried 14 game feeds in ten languages to Sirius subscribers, as well as to XM subscribers with the "Best of Sirius" package. In addition to the four US feeds mentioned above, Sirius carried the following international feeds:

: BBC Radio 5 Live (English; Arlo White announcing)
: Canal+ Spain (Spanish)
: NTV Plus (Russian)
: W9 (French)
: NHK (Japanese)
: ARD (German)
: RAI (Italian)
: Sport1 (Hungarian)
: Prime Sport (Dutch)
: Viasat (Danish)

FieldPass, the subscription Internet radio service provided by the league at NFL.com, also carried most of these feeds. Due to contractual restrictions, only Sirius XM and FieldPass were permitted to carry the local team broadcasts along with WLHK, WFNI and WWL, with the teams' other network radio affiliates instead airing the Westwood One feed.

Entertainment and other ceremonies

Pregame

Barenaked Ladies played the Super Bowl Saturday Night event with O.A.R. and Robert Randolph and the Family Band. Chris Daughtry, Steve Winwood and Queen Latifah performed during the Super Bowl pre-game tailgate party, which started at 2:00 p.m.

Queen Latifah sang "America the Beautiful and Carrie Underwood sang "The Star-Spangled Banner". Underwood's performance marked the third straight year that an alumnus of American Idol has been invited to perform the national anthem, joining Jordin Sparks at Super Bowl XLII and Jennifer Hudson a year later. Translation of both songs into American Sign Language was provided by Kinesha Battles, a student at the Florida School for the Deaf and Blind.

To commemorate the 15th anniversary of the San Francisco 49ers' fifth Super Bowl victory, which took place at this stadium, Jerry Rice, who had also been MVP of Super Bowl XXIII, another Super Bowl played at this stadium, joined the coin toss ceremonies. Rice had just been named to the Pro Football Hall of Fame Class of 2010. The rest of the class – Rickey Jackson, Dick LeBeau, Floyd Little, Russ Grimm, John Randle, and Emmitt Smith – were named the day before. The Saints won the coin toss, marking the 13th straight Super Bowl the NFC won the toss (the Cardinals won the toss in Super Bowl XLIII but elected to defer to the second half, giving the Steelers the ball to open the game).

Halftime

The Who performed at the Super Bowl XLIV halftime show. The band played a medley of their hits, consisting of "Pinball Wizard", "Baba O'Riley", "Who Are You", "See Me, Feel Me", and "Won't Get Fooled Again". For the first time since the Super Bowl XXXIV halftime show, there was no crowd of fans surrounding the halftime stage. This performance was also released as downloadable content for the Rock Band series, named "The Who Super Bowl S-mashup".

Merchandising
Retailers had ordered much more New Orleans Saints merchandise prior to the game than they had ordered Colts merchandise. The NFL estimated that US$100million worth of Super Bowl merchandise would be sold.

Game summary

First quarter
As the designated home team in the annual rotation between AFC and NFC teams, the Colts elected to wear their home blue uniforms with white pants, while the Saints wore their road white uniforms with old gold pants.

The Saints won the coin toss and chose to receive, but their first possession resulted in a punt after going three-and-out.

The Colts offense took the field for the first time, with the ball spotted at their own 27-yard line. The Colts put together a drive that went 53 yards and resulted in a 38-yard field goal by kicker Matt Stover.  At 42 years old, Stover became the oldest person in NFL history to play in a Super Bowl.

Following the game's first score, Courtney Roby returned the ensuing kickoff to the New Orleans 26-yard line. Approaching the 25-yard line, Roby swooped into a dive and appeared to fumble the ball, but he was ruled down by contact. This time, the Saints managed to get a first down with a 16-yard completion from Drew Brees to Reggie Bush, but they were eventually forced to punt again. Punter Thomas Morstead pinned the Colts back at their own 4-yard line with a 46-yard kick.

Indianapolis responded with a 96-yard scoring drive, tying the record for the longest drive in Super Bowl history. Joseph Addai rushed three times for 53 yards on the drive, while Manning completed three passes for 35 yards, the last one a 19-yard touchdown pass to wide receiver Pierre Garçon, increasing the Colts lead to 10–0.

Second quarter
The Saints' next drive carried over from the previous quarter. Brees completed three passes for 36 yards as the Saints advanced to the Colts' 22-yard line. But on third down, Brees was sacked for a 7-yard loss by Dwight Freeney, forcing New Orleans to settle for a 46-yard field goal from Garrett Hartley. After scoring points on their first 2 drives, the Colts looked to add more, but Garcon dropped a pass on 3rd down. The Colts were forced to punt and the Saints took over driving down into Colt territory. They drove down the field to a 1st-and-goal at the Colts' 3-yard line. A false start penalty set them back to the 8, and after getting a yard away from the end zone, they attempted 3rd and 4th down runs. They failed to convert both times. The Colts ran three straight running plays in an effort to wind down the clock and go to halftime with a seven-point lead, but the Saints kept the Colts from getting another first down. Following Bush's 4-yard punt return to the New Orleans 48, with only one timeout left to use in the half, the Saints got back into field goal territory, and Hartley hit a 44-yard field goal as time expired, with the Colts still leading 10–6. This was the first 10–6 halftime score in Super Bowl history.

Third quarter
The Colts were set to receive the ball to start the second half, but were caught by surprise when the Saints executed an onside kick. This was the first onside kick attempted before the fourth quarter in Super Bowl history, a play the Saints referred to as "Ambush." Thomas Morstead kicked the ball to his left, and after traveling almost 15 yards, the ball bounced off the face-mask of the Colts' Hank Baskett, who failed to make a clean recovery. Several players dove for the loose ball, creating a pile that took over a minute for the officiating crew to separate. When the dust finally cleared, linebacker Jonathan Casillas of New Orleans was officially credited with the recovery on the 42-yard line, but Casillas and other Saints players insisted that it was actually safety Chris Reis who came up with the football. The Saints' offense took over and stormed down the field on an effective 58-yard drive in which they never faced a third down. Brees completed five consecutive passes for 58 yards on the drive and capped it off with a 'check-down' pass on the right side to Pierre Thomas, who took it 16 yards to the end zone behind blocks from Jonathan Goodwin, Jahri Evans, Devery Henderson, Kyle Eckel, Carl Nicks, and Jeremy Shockey, to give the Saints their first lead of the game at 13–10.

Manning and the Colts answered with their own touchdown drive, moving the ball 76 yards in ten plays. Clark caught 3 passes for 45 yards, while Joseph Addai finished the drive off with a 4-yard touchdown run to put the Colts back on top 17–13 with 6:15 remaining in the quarter. For just the second time in Super Bowl history both teams scored touchdowns on their initial possessions of the second half; the only other time occurred in Super Bowl XIV.

Hartley would bring the Saints to within one point of tying the game at 17–16, with his third field goal, launched from 47 yards away. In doing so he became the first kicker in Super Bowl history to score three field goals of 40 or more yards in one game.

This was the first one-point lead after the third quarter in Super Bowl history and second closest game after three-quarters, behind Super Bowl XXXIX which was tied between the New England Patriots and Philadelphia Eagles.

Fourth quarter
Indianapolis responded with a drive to the New Orleans 33-yard line, only to have Stover miss a 51-yard field goal attempt, giving the ball back to the Saints with good field position on their 41-yard line. After that, Brees led the Saints on another touchdown drive featuring seven different players getting the ball. Bush started off the drive with a 12-yard run, and then Devery Henderson caught a pass on the Colts' 36-yard line. Following an 8-yard catch and run by Bush, Brees completed passes to Colston, Robert Meachem and tight end David Thomas, moving the ball to the 5-yard line. After a 3-yard run by Pierre Thomas, Brees threw a 2-yard touchdown pass to tight end Jeremy Shockey. Rather than settle for a six-point lead, and risk a potential Colts game-winning touchdown, the Saints chanced a two-point conversion. Lance Moore received a pass and attempted to stretch the ball out over the goal line as he fell to the ground and rolled over on his head. The ball was kicked away from his hands by defender Jacob Lacey, and the play was ruled an incomplete pass, prompting a coach's challenge from Sean Payton. After the review, the ruling on the field was overturned when it was determined that Moore maintained possession of the ball long enough and the ball had crossed the plane of the goal line for a successful conversion, giving the Saints a 24–17 advantage.

On the ensuing drive, Manning led the Colts into Saints territory; however, Tracy Porter intercepted a pass by Manning at the Saints 26 for the first takeaway of the game and returned it 74 yards for a touchdown; following the successful extra point, the Saints' lead grew to 31–17 with 3:12 remaining. Porter's interception return for a touchdown improved teams to 10–0 in Super Bowls when returning an interception for a touchdown, although that record is now 12–1 following Super Bowl LI (when the New England Patriots overcame a 28–3 deficit versus the Atlanta Falcons).

Now down by two possessions, the Colts needed a touchdown on their next drive to stay alive, though they still had all three of their timeouts to use. They were able to drive to the New Orleans 3-yard line. When an offensive pass interference penalty on 1st and goal pushed them back 10 yards, the Colts got those 10 yards back on the next play. However, the next three plays saw a tipped pass that went off the goal post and incomplete, a loss of two yards on a rushing play, and a pass that went through the hands of wide receiver Reggie Wayne and incomplete, effectively sealing the win for the Saints. Brees knelt the ball with 0:44 left on the clock, ending Super Bowl XLIV and winning the Saints' first league championship in franchise history, the first major league world championship for the state of Louisiana.

Box score

Statistical overview
Drew Brees was named Super Bowl MVP for tying a Super Bowl record by completing 32 of 39 passes, with 288 passing yards and two touchdowns. After the game, Brees said, "Four years ago, who ever thought this would be happening when 85 percent of the city was under water? Most people left not knowing if New Orleans would ever come back, or if the organization would ever come back. We just all looked at one another and said, 'We are going to rebuild together. We are going to lean on each other.' This is the culmination in all that belief."

Final statistics
Sources: NFL.com Super Bowl XLIV, Super Bowl XLIV Play Finder NO, Super Bowl XLIV Play Finder Ind, Hoffco Super Bowl XLIV Play by Play

Statistical comparison

Individual statistics

Notes:
 1 Completions/attempts
 2 Carries
 3 Long gain
 4 Receptions
 5 Times targeted

Super Bowl records
New Orleans recorded the first successful onside kick attempt in a Super Bowl outside of the fourth quarter.
Indianapolis' place kicker Matt Stover became the oldest player to participate, as well as to score, in a Super Bowl at 42 years and 11 days of age.
New Orleans' place kicker Garrett Hartley became the first kicker in Super Bowl history to kick three field goals of 40 or more yards.
New Orleans' victory marked the sixth straight win by the team wearing its white jersey.
New Orleans quarterback Drew Brees had the second highest completion percentage in Super Bowl history (Phil Simms in Super Bowl XXI has the highest.) Brees also tied the mark for most completions in a Super Bowl, with 32. Drew Brees then broke the record when he made a 33rd pass completion in the game on a two-point conversion pass to Lance Moore in the 4th quarter.
This was the first Super Bowl played in the formerly-named-Joe Robbie Stadium not to have a kickoff returned for a touchdown; because the Colts did not have a return touchdown, they also became the first team ever to lose a Super Bowl at this venue without achieving that. The San Francisco 49ers would later join them after Super Bowl LIV.
New Orleans became the third team to win the Super Bowl after trailing at halftime and failing to score a first-half touchdown. The New York Giants in Super Bowl XLII and the Dallas Cowboys in Super Bowl XXVIII are the only other two teams to do so. The New England Patriots would join them in Super Bowl LI.
The Saints' 25 points in the second half is the fourth highest total in Super Bowl history. The New York Giants scored 30 in Super Bowl XXI while 28 was scored by both the San Francisco 49ers in Super Bowl XXIV and the Tampa Bay Buccaneers in Super Bowl XXXVII.
The Saints also became the seventh team to win a Super Bowl after trailing to start the fourth quarter. The others to do so were: the Giants in Super Bowl XLII, the 49ers in Super Bowl XXIII, the Washington Redskins in Super Bowl XVII, the Pittsburgh Steelers in Super Bowls X and XIV and the Colts in Super Bowl V.
Brees and Peyton Manning combined for a Super Bowl record 75% completion rate (63 of 84). They also accounted for the most combined pass completions in a Super Bowl, with 63.
The Colts became just the sixth team to score 10 or more points in the first quarter and lose the game, joining the Chicago Bears in Super Bowl XLI, Miami Dolphins in Super Bowl XIX, the Denver Broncos in both Super Bowls XXI and XXII, and the New England Patriots in Super Bowl XXXI
Having been down 10 points in the first quarter, the Saints tied a record for the biggest comeback win in Super Bowl history, set in Super Bowl XXII when the Washington Redskins faced a 10-point first quarter deficit of their own. The New England Patriots tied this record in Super Bowl XLIX and broke it in Super Bowl LI when they overcame a 25-point deficit to beat the Atlanta Falcons in overtime. The Kansas City Chiefs in Super Bowl LIV would also tie New Orleans' 10-point comeback. 
 The Saints are the ninth team to win the Super Bowl on their first attempt. The others are the Green Bay Packers of Super Bowl I, the New York Jets of Super Bowl III, the Pittsburgh Steelers of Super Bowl IX, the San Francisco 49ers of Super Bowl XVI, the Chicago Bears of Super Bowl XX, the New York Giants of Super Bowl XXI, the Baltimore Ravens of Super Bowl XXXV, and the Tampa Bay Buccaneers of Super Bowl XXXVII.

Starting lineups

Source:

Aftermath
Slate writer Justin Peters viewed every Super Bowl over a two-month period before Super Bowl 50. About Super Bowl XLIV, which he ranked the fifth best, he had this to say: "...coming as it did five years after New Orleans was flooded in Hurricane Katrina, the Saints' victory actually mattered."

The Saints finished the next season with an 11–5 record, but failed to defend their league title after they were eliminated by the Seattle Seahawks in the Wild Card playoff round. Super Bowl XLIV later became the subject of the wider New Orleans Saints bounty scandal, also known as "Bountygate", in which the NFL alleged in 2012 that several Saints defenders operated a slush fund that was in operation from the 2009 season and Super Bowl XLIV, through 2011. This alleged slush fund paid out bonuses, or "bounties", for in-game performance in violation of NFL rules, including deliberately injuring or knocking opposing players out of games. The league responded with some of the most severe sanctions in the league's 92-year history, and among the most severe punishments for an on-field incident in North American professional sports history. On appeal, former Commissioner Paul Tagliabue, appointed by Goodell to investigate, agreed that the bounty program had taken place, but he disagreed that it was the NFL's place to enact disciplinary measures and contended it was the duty of the coaches and management. All player suspensions were overturned in 2012. In 2012, New Orleans failed to make the playoffs for the first time since their Super Bowl win, with the sanctions for Bountygate cited as one of the primary causes. The Saints rebounded in 2013, but were eliminated in the Divisional playoff round by the eventual Super Bowl XLVIII champion Seattle Seahawks. They returned to the playoffs in 2017 by defeating the Carolina Panthers in the Wild Card Round, but lost to the Minnesota Vikings in the Divisional Round. The next season they defeated the Philadelphia Eagles in the Divisional Round to advance to their first NFC Championship Game since 2009 but lost to the Los Angeles Rams in controversial fashion. After playoff losses in 2019 and 2020, Saints quarterback and Super Bowl XLIV MVP Drew Brees retired after 20 seasons. Super Bowl XLIV remains the franchise's only Super Bowl appearance.

The Colts would finish the next season with a 10–6 record, but lost in the Wild Card round to the New York Jets. After that, the Colts plummeted to 2–14 after they lost Peyton Manning for the 2011 season to neck surgery. Manning was released following the season and signed with the Denver Broncos, with whom he won Super Bowl 50. The Colts would then proceed to draft quarterback Andrew Luck first overall in the 2012 NFL Draft, with whom they went 11–5 for three consecutive years, won the AFC South twice, and made the 2014 AFC Championship Game, losing to the New England Patriots 45–7. In the 2015 and 2016 Colts' seasons, they finished 8–8 and missed the playoffs, which was mostly because Luck missed 10 combined games due to various injuries. In the 2017 season, the team finished 4–12 after they lost Luck to a shoulder injury for the year. Since Super Bowl XLIV, Indianapolis has been 106–103–1, with a 3–5 postseason record.

The Saints were the last team to win a championship game of a major professional sports league in North America on their first attempt until the Toronto Raptors in 2019 (with the Washington Nationals repeating this feat mere months later).

Officials
Referee – Scott Green (#19)
Umpire – Undrey Wash (#96)
Head Linesman – John McGrath (#5)
Line Judge – Jeff Seeman (#45)
Field Judge – Rob Vernatchi (#75)
Side Judge – Greg Meyer (#78)
Back Judge – Greg Steed (#12)
Alternate Referee – Gene Steratore
Alternate Umpire – Ruben Fowler
Alternate Flank – Jim Mello
Alternate Deep – Jeff Lamberth
Alternate Back Judge – Kirk Dornan

Game time and weather conditions
 Kickoff was at 6:32 p.m. EST (23:32 UTC).
 Game length was 3 hrs. 14 min.

References

External links

 
 NFL.com's official Super Bowl website
 Host committee website
 
 Super Bowl XLIV at ESPN
 

Super Bowl 044
2009 National Football League season
2010 in American football
2010 in American television
2010 in sports in Florida
2010s in Miami
American football in Florida
February 2010 sports events in the United States
Indianapolis Colts postseason
New Orleans Saints postseason
Sports competitions in Miami Gardens, Florida